Evans Point is an ice-covered point fronting on Peacock Sound, lying  west-northwest of Von der Wall Point on the south side of Thurston Island. The Trice Islands lie just to the west. It was first plotted from air photos taken by U.S. Navy Operation Highjump in December 1946, and was named by the Advisory Committee on Antarctic Names for Richard Evans, an oceanographer on the USS Burton Island in this area during the U.S. Navy Bellingshausen Sea Expedition, February 1960.

Maps
 Thurston Island – Jones Mountains. 1:500000 Antarctica Sketch Map. US Geological Survey, 1967.
 Antarctic Digital Database (ADD). Scale 1:250000 topographic map of Antarctica. Scientific Committee on Antarctic Research (SCAR). Since 1993, regularly upgraded and updated.

References 

Headlands of Ellsworth Land